Ishika Taneja (born 2 September 1994 ) is Miss India (2017–18) was crowned the Business Woman of the World at Miss World Tourism held in Melaka, Malaysia on January 27, 2018.  She has also won the titles for Miss Popularity and Miss Beauty with Brain as Miss India.

She was awarded the Rashtrapati Award of "100 Women Achievers of India" by the President of India, Pranab Mukherjee on January 26, 2016.aa

Career
Ishika also featured in a promotional song for the Indian Political Thriller film Indu Sarkar, co-written, co-produced, and directed by Madhur Bhandarkar in 2017. Ishika has also played the lead role as Rhea in the Indian web series Hadh, which was produced and written by Vikram Bhatt.

Ishika won a Guinness world record in December 2014 by doing fastest 60 full airbrush makeups in 60 minutes on 60 different models in DLF Emporio Mall, New Delhi.
 She was the first Indian to make such an attempt in the field of hair, makeup and beauty industry. All looks were totally different from each other and included full face foundation with eye makeup, lipstick and blush.

Ishika plays an important role of the executive director of Bharti Taneja's Beauty Group, which runs beauty clinics, beauty schools, skin and hair care products and range of cosmetics based all over India.

Ishika is also known for her philanthropic activities especially for rape victims, acid attack victims, orphans and old age. She dedicated her Guinness world record to Nirbhaya's parents as an honor with 12 lakhs of free education to 24 rape victims.

References

Business Woman of the tourism World 
mis india tourism ishika taneja
ishika taneja 100 women achievers
ishika taneja dilli ki rat
hadh ishika taneja
ishika taneja Guinness
ishika taneja executive director alps
ishika taneja acid attack
ishika taneja orphans
ishika taneja valantine makeover

External links 

 

Living people
Women artists from Delhi
1994 births